Io sono Mia ("I am Mia" in Italian, but also "I am Mine") is a 2019 Italian film directed by Riccardo Donna. The film narrates the life of Mia Martini, including her artistic career, her entourage, her sister Loredana, the managers she knew, and her tumultuous relationships with their parents.

Plot 
The film begins in 1989 in Sanremo, with a flashback from the 1970s. Some episodes from her childhood (when her father hits her because she wants to sing and not to study), her artistic career, and family, are spoken during an interview granted to a journalist a few hours before singing at the Festival of 1989.

In the 1970s, Mia participated in the Festivalbar, winning the competition twice, in 1972 and 1973. Then it comes a dramatic period of slander launched in the late 1970s by a producer with whom she refused to work with and who accuses Mia of bringing bad luck. Mia then enters into a troubled love relationship with the Milanese photographer Andrew (inspired by Ivano Fossati, who did not want to participate in the film) with whom she falls in love with. She has a relationship with him for ten years. The film also evokes the character of the original Anthony who is inspired by Renato Zero, who also did not want to be mentioned in the movie, just like Fossati.

Cast
 Serena Rossi as Mia Martini 
 Maurizio Lastrico as Andrew
 Lucia Mascino as Sandra Neri 
 Dajana Roncione as Loredana Bertè 
 Antonio Gerardi as Alberigo Crocetta
 Nina Torresi as Alba Calia
 Daniele Mariani as Anthony
 Francesca Turrin as Mia's manager
 Fabrizio Coniglio as Roberto Galanti
 Gioia Spaziani as Maria Salvina Dato
 Duccio Camerini as Giuseppe Radames Bertè
 Simone Gandolfo as chiefredactor
 Corrado Invernizzi as Charles Aznavour
 Edoardo Pesce as Franco Califano
 Mauro Serio as medical doctor

Awards 
 Special Nastro d'Argento to Serena Rossi

References

External links
 

2019 films
2019 drama films
Italian drama films
2010s Italian-language films
Films set in 2019
Films set in Italy
Films set in Rome
Italian biographical films
Cultural depictions of Italian women
2010s Italian films